Nubemhat (nbw-m-ḥ3t, Gold is at the front, Gold is a name for Hathor) was an ancient Egyptian queen of the Second Intermediate Period. She was the wife of king Sekhemre Wadjkhaw Sobekemsaf I. She had the title Great Royal Wife and is known from several monuments. A statue with her name and title was found at Kawa in Nubia. She also appears on a stela from Denderah where her daughter, the king's daughter Sobekemheb is mentioned. There also appears the king's son Ameny, son of the queen Haankhes.

Her only known title is ḥm.t-nswt-wr.t ("Great Royal Wife").

References

Weblink 
Nubemhat on Persons and Names of the Middle Kingdom

17th-century BC Egyptian people
17th-century BC women
Queens consort of the Seventeenth Dynasty of Egypt